Nikos Nikolopoulos may refer to:

 Nikolaos Nikolopoulos (born 1958), Greek politician.
 Nikos Nikolopoulos (footballer) (born 1999), Greek footballer